Hans-Emil Schuster (born 19 September 1934 in Hamburg) is a German astronomer and a discoverer of minor planets and comets, who retired in October 1991. He worked at Hamburg Observatory at Bergedorf and European Southern Observatory (ESO), and was former acting director of La Silla Observatory. From 1982 he was married to Rosemarie Schuster née von Holt (28 March 1935 – 18 September 2006)

He discovered periodic comet 106P/Schuster. He also discovered the comet C/1976 D2 (in the contemporary nomenclature, it was known as Comet 1975 II or 1976c), which was notable for its large perihelion distance of 6.88 AU  , the largest yet observed at the time.

He discovered 25 asteroids, including notably the Apollo asteroid 2329 Orthos and the Amor asteroids 2608 Seneca, 3271 Ul, 3288 Seleucus, and 3908 Nyx. He discovered the near-Earth asteroid 161989 Cacus, which was lost and not recovered until 2003.

Schuster participated in the exploration, selection and testing of the sites of two ESO observatories: La Silla Observatory and Paranal Observatory (the latter is the VLT site).

He also participated in two ESO Southern Sky Surveys: the ESO-B survey ("Quick-Blue Survey") completed in 1978 was the first deep optical survey of the southern sky; and the "Red Sky Survey". Photographic plates were taken with the ESO's 1-meter Schmidt Telescope at La Silla.

He co-discovered the Phoenix Dwarf galaxy (with Richard M. West), and in 1976 also discovered the Eridanus Globular Cluster, one of the most distant globular clusters in the galactic halo. In 1980, he discovered a type-II supernova in the galaxy NGC 1255. However, "Schuster's Spiral" (Horologium Dwarf) is not named after him, but a different Schuster.

Honours 

The asteroid 2018 Schuster was named in his honour. On 21 October 2011 he was awarded the rank of Commander of the Order of Bernardo O'Higgins in recognition of his important contribution to astronomy in Chile.

List of discovered minor planets

See also

References

External links 
 The ESO/Uppsala Survey of the ESO(B) Atlas 
 106P/Schuster, cometography.com
 Phoenix Dwarf, Spider's Homepage

1934 births
Living people
20th-century German astronomers
Discoverers of asteroids